Pakistan competed at the 2018 Commonwealth Games in the Gold Coast, Australia from April 4 to April 15, 2018.

Weightlifter Usman Amjad Rathore was the country's flag bearer during the opening ceremony.

Competitors
The following is the list of number of competitors participating at the Games per sport/discipline.

Medalists

|  style="text-align:left; vertical-align:top;"|

Athletics

Men
Field events

Women
Track & road events

Badminton

Pakistan participated with four athletes (two men and two women)

Singles

Doubles

Mixed team

Roster
Murad Ali
Palwasha Bashir
Muhammad Irfan Bhatti
Mahoor Shahzad

Pool A

Boxing

Pakistan participated with a team of 4 athletes (4 men).

Men

Hockey

Men's tournament

Roster

Mazhar Abbas
Tasawar Abbas
Mubashar Ali
Muhammad Arshad
Muhammad Atiq
Ammad Shakeel Butt
Imran Butt
Muhammad Dilber
Muhammad Irfan
Muhammad Irfan
Abu Mahmood
Muhammad Qadir
Muhammad Arslan Qadir
Shafqat Rasool
Rana Riaz
Muhammad Rizwan
Ali Shan
Tazeem Ul Hassan

Pool B

Seventh and eighth place

Shooting

Pakistan participated with 7 athletes (5 men and 2 women).

Men

Women

Squash

Pakistan participated with 4 athletes (2 men and 2 women).

Individual

Doubles

Swimming

Pakistan participated with 2 athletes (1 man and 1 woman).

Men

Women

Table tennis

Pakistan participated with 4 athletes (2 men and 2 women).

Singles

Doubles

Weightlifting

Pakistan participated with 5 athletes (5 men).

Men

Wrestling

Pakistan participated with 6 athletes (6 men).

Men

See also
Pakistan at the 2018 Summer Youth Olympics

References

External links
Schedule - Pakistan

Nations at the 2018 Commonwealth Games
Pakistan at the Commonwealth Games
2018 in Pakistani sport